Robert Dryden (February 8, 1917 – December 16, 2003) was an American actor and voice-over performer "whose acting career spanned over four decades of radio, television, theater, and film appearances."

Radio
Dryden played Sergeant Maggio in Call the Police, He also was active on The FBI in Peace and War, The Shadow, The Fat Man, Big Town, Gang Busters, The Adventures of Superman, and much later, CBS Radio Mystery Theater" and The General Mills Radio Adventure Theater.

Television
He appeared in several television  programs as well, including Naked City, The Web, Route 66, and Saturday Night Live.

Filmography

Four Boys and a Gun (1957) - Joe Barton
For a Few Dollars More (1965) - Old Prophet (voice, uncredited)
Taking Off (1971) - Dr. Bronson
Man on a Swing (1974) - Mr. Dawson
Fore Play (1975) - Pharmacist
The Happy Hooker (1975) - Mr. Gordon

References

External links

Metropolitan Washington Old Time Radio Club

1917 births
2003 deaths
American male film actors
American male radio actors
American male television actors
20th-century American male actors
People with Parkinson's disease
American male stage actors